Jacobus Zegers (died 14 January 1644) was an academic printer and bookseller in Leuven, with many clients among the faculty of Leuven University. He was the printer of Cornelius Jansen's Augustinus (1640).

Life
Zegers settled in Leuven around 1631, married twice, and had a thriving business as an academic publisher and bookseller. His clients included Nicolaus Vernulaeus and Diodorus Tuldenus.

Having printed Cornelius Jansen's massive three-volume Augustinus in 1640, the papal condemnation of the work and the ensuing controversies drove Zegers to the brink of bankruptcy and led to his untimely death. His widow continued the bookshop, with the support of Jansenist patrons.

Publications
 1631: Cornelius Jansen, Notarum spongia
 1635: anonymous (Cornelius Jansen) Mars Gallicus
 1639: Cornelius Jansen, Tetrateuchus, sive Commentarius in sancta Iesu Christi evangelia
 1640: Nicolaus Vernulaeus, Virtutum augustissimae gentis austriacae. Libri tres
 1640: Cornelius Jansen, Augustinus
 1641: Cornelius Jansen, Pentateuchus: sive commentarius in quinque libros Moysis
 1641: Nicolaus Vernulaeus, Laudatio funebris principi Ferdinando

References

Studies
 L. Ceyssens, "Jacobus Zegers, drukker te Leuven", Eigen Schoon en De Brabander 45 (1964): 204-216.

External links
 Volume 1 of Augustinus on Google Books (from Ghent University Library).
 Volume 2 of Augustinus on Google Books (from Complutense University of Madrid).
 Volume 3 of Augustinus on Google Books (from Complutense University of Madrid).
 Cornelius Jansen's Pentateuchus on Google Books (from the Bavarian State Library).

Year of birth unknown
1644 deaths
Scientists from Leuven
17th-century printers
Book publishers (people) of the Spanish Netherlands
Year of birth uncertain